Cisiec  is a village in the administrative district of Gmina Węgierska Górka, within Żywiec County, Silesian Voivodeship, in southern Poland.

The village has a population of 3,214.

References
 Cisiec village and village football club website

Villages in Żywiec County